Arctium minus, commonly known as lesser burdock, little burdock, louse-bur, common burdock, button-bur, cuckoo-button, or wild rhubarb, is a biennial plant. This plant is native to Europe, but has become introduced elsewhere such as Australia, North and South America, and other places.

Lesser burdock produces purple flowers in its second year of growth, from July to October. Outer bracts end in hooks that are like Velcro. After the flower head dries, the hooked bracts will attach to humans and animals to transport the entire seedhead.

Characteristics 
It is large and bushy. Flowers are prickly and pink to lavender in color. The plant flowers from July through October. The flowers resemble and can be easily mistaken for thistles, but burdock can be distinguished by its extremely large (up to 50 cm) leaves and its hooked bracts. Leaves are long and ovate. Lower leaves are heart-shaped and have very wavy margins. Leaves are dark green above and woolly below. It grows an extremely deep taproot, up to  into the ground.

Uses 
The leafstalks (a year old or younger) and flower stalks can be eaten raw or cooked. The roots are edible boiled with a change of water, though become too woody to eat in plants over a year old.

References

External links

  Many pictures & information

minus
Edible plants
Flora of Europe
Plants described in 1762